Mohammad Abdul Razaq Dabbas (1927 – 21 August 2014) was a Jordanian politician. Dabbas was born in Salt. He studied economics at the University of Texas, receiving a master's degree. He also completed a study of administration of University of California. Dabbas returned to Jordan and worked amongst others as director general of the Income and Sales Tax Department and the State Budget Department. He later served as Minister of Finance between 1976 and 1979 in the government of Mudar Badran.

References

1927 births
2014 deaths
People from Al-Salt
University of Texas at Austin alumni
University of California alumni
Finance ministers of Jordan